The Los Angeles Times Festival of Books is a free, public festival celebrating the written word. It is the largest book festival in the United States, annually drawing approximately 150,000 attendees. Started in 1996, the Festival is held on the penultimate weekend of April, hosted by the University of Southern California, and features vendors, authors and publishers.  Some of the events are panels with authors discussing a common subject, storytelling and performances for children as well as the  Los Angeles Times Book Prizes.

Highlights

2023
The 28th Festival of Books will return 22-23 April. See website below for information.

2022
The Festival of Books is on April 23 and 24, 2022. More than 500 writers, musicians, artists and chefs, hundreds of exhibitors and an expected 150,000 attendees will transform the 226-acre campus into a vibrant cultural festival in the heart of the Downtown Arts and Education Corridor.
The stages and activity areas will feature celebrity authors, family-friendly entertainment, cooking demonstrations, Spanish-language programming, live music and poetry readings
Dozens of expert panels on a variety of subjects, including politics and pop culture. More than 200 exhibitors with books and merchandise for sale, activities and giveaways, including special themed areas. There are musical performances, food trucks and an Independent author pavilion with a variety of indie writers and titles. Admission to the festival is free. Schedule, location, ticket and transportation information can be found on latimes.com/FOB, Facebook page, Twitter and Instagram feed (#bookfest).

For the first time, strict measures will be undertaken, like wearing masks and social distancing. All attendees must have a vaccination card downloaded onto their phones to show to security for entry.

2021
The Festival of Books, Stories & Ideas is back April 17th to the 22nd - bigger and better and all virtual - brought to you FREE by the L.A. Times. Attendees can hear authors, celebrities, moguls, poets, musicians and more discuss ideas with our award-winning journalists on topics like science, mysteries, fiction, comedy, autobiographies and everything in between. RSVP at latimes.com/FOB

2020
The 25th Festival of Books was held on a virtual basis, because the safety of the visitors & staff are paramount. Started in mid-October and continued over four straight weeks.

2019
The 2019 Los Angeles Times Festival was held from April 13 to 14 at the University of Southern California. Highlights include The L.A. Times Book Prizes where authors Nafissa Thompson-Spires,  Francisco Cantu and Rebecca Makkai won, and continuation of the spirit of the book festival thru the L.A. Times Book Club, a  year-round new and more intimate forum.

2011
The annual Los Angeles Times Festival of Books was held for the first time at University of Southern California on Saturday and Sunday, April 30 and May 1. Some of the authors included Patti Smith, Jennifer Egan, Mary Higgins Clark, Nancy Temple Rodrigue, Nick Flynn, and  Dave Eggers.

2010
The festival on Saturday and Sunday, April 24 and 25, had 450 announced authors, including Father Gregory Boyle,  Lisa "Hungry Girl" Lillien, Meg Cabot, Mary Higgins Clark, Dave Eggers, James Ellroy, Daisy Fuentes, Louis Gossett Jr., Terry McMillan, Bernadette Peters, Jane Smiley, and Alice Waters.

2009
The 2009 Festival of Books was held on Saturday & Sunday, April 25 and 26, 2009. More than 100 panel discussions and readings, with nearly 450 authors participating, were scheduled in the various classrooms on both days. Topics included "Mystery: A Dark & Stormy Night", "Young Adult Fiction: Problem Child", "Rock & A Hard Place: Security & American Ideals", "Poof! Our Evaporating Economy", "Fiction: Intimate Strangers", "Mystery: Cold Cases", "History: The Underbelly of California", and "The Soloist from Page to Screen"

Some of the authors and panelists scheduled for panel discussions were James Ellroy, T.C. Boyle, Kevin J. Anderson, Michael J. Fox, S.E. Hinton, Clive Barker, Diahann Carroll, Ray Bradbury, and Gore Vidal. There were a number of areas set up for authors and moderators to sign their books. Additionally, there were many events planned at the various outdoor stages. Hip Hop Harry and Bullseye (mascot) entertained the children at the Target stage.

Robert Alter, "author of many acclaimed works on the Bible, literary modernism, and contemporary Hebrew literature",  received the 29th annual Los Angeles Times Book Prizes' Robert Kirsch Award for lifetime achievement. He was in a conversation with Jonathan Kirsch at the festival.

Early history

Pre 2009
The Festival was conceived during an American Booksellers Association event held at the LA Convention Center.  Festival Co-Founders Narda Zacchino and Lisa Cleri Reale were discussing Book Festivals around the country.  Zacchino stated that she had always wanted to launch a Festival in Los Angeles.  Cleri Reale responded, "Why don't we do it?"  With a small allocation of funding from each of their departments, Zacchino and Cleri Reale moved forward with their plans. The initial Planning Committee was small but passionate group of Times employees who worked on their time.

Until 2010, the festival was hosted at the campus of the University of California, Los Angeles, however, after University of California officials and event organizers disagreed on how to share expenses, particularly in light of the recent budget cuts to the UC system, the festival was moved permanently to USC. The event has typically been held during the last week of April, though it has been moved to the first week, to avoid a scheduling conflict with Fiesta Broadway.

See also

 Los Angeles Times
 Los Angeles Times Book Prize
 Books in the United States

Notes

External links
 Festival Of Books FAQ

Book fairs in the United States
Los Angeles Times